Henry Everett Jackson  was a Major League Baseball player. He played  in 10 games for the 1887 Indianapolis Hoosiers of the National League.

Sources

Major League Baseball first basemen
Indianapolis Hoosiers (NL) players
19th-century baseball players
1861 births
1932 deaths
Allentown Peanuts players
Jackson Jaxons players
Baseball players from Indiana
People from Union City, Indiana